This is a list of fellows of the Royal Society elected in 1700.

Fellows
Otto Sperling  (1634–1715)
Abraham Cyprianus  (1660–1718)
John Keill  (1671–1721)
Philip Sydenham  (1676–1739)
Charles Du Bois  (1656–1740)

References

1700
1700 in science
1700 in England